Heno (meaning Tonight in Welsh) is a Welsh-language television programme broadcast on S4C.

Heno can also refer to:

Heno, founder of the village of Hainewalde in Saxony
Heno, nickname of Armenian footballer Henrikh Mkhitaryan
Heno Magee, first winner in 1976 of the Rooney Prize for Irish Literature
Heno Patera, a volcanic patera on Jupiter's moon Io
Hé-no, an Iroquois thunder spirit